Volcan is a ghost town in Newton County, Mississippi, United States.

Located five miles southwest of Newton, Mississippi, Volcan was first established as a flag stop on the Gulf, Mobile and Northern Railroad in October of 1913. It had a six car stub track. The community dissolved sometime after 1916.

References 

Former populated places in Newton County, Mississippi
Former populated places in Mississippi